Drozdowo  is a village in the administrative district of Gmina Kowale Oleckie, within Olecko County, Warmian-Masurian Voivodeship, in northern Poland.

The village has an approximate population of 250.

Notable residents
Gustav von Saltzwedel (1808–1897), politician
Wilhelm von Saltzwedel (1820–1882), public official

References

Drozdowo